Allan McNab Renfrew (December 21, 1924 – November 10, 2014) was a hockey player (left wing) at the University of Michigan in the late 1940s and a college hockey coach with Michigan Technological University (1951–1956), the University of North Dakota (1956–1957), and the University of Michigan (1957–1973).  Renfrew had a storied career as a player, coach and administrator at the University of Michigan, including NCAA championships as both a player and coach.  He was inducted into the University of Michigan Athletic Hall of Honor in 1986.

College hockey player
A native of Toronto, Renfrew came to the University of Michigan in 1945. He played four years with the Michigan hockey team, and was selected as the team captain as a senior.  As a freshman in 1946, he drew attention when he scored two goals separated by only seven seconds in a game against Michigan Tech.  He was the leader of the Wolverines 1948 team that won the NCAA hockey championship.  He scored 25 goals in 1948, including four in a game against Minnesota: "Al Renfrew, Michigan's speedy left winger, scored four times to lead the assault."  The Wolverines finished the 1948 season by bearing Dartmouth College, 8-4, in the first NCAA ice hockey championship held in March 1948 in Colorado Springs, Colorado.  Renfrew scored 91 goals and 172 points, as the Wolverines went 70-18-6 while Renfrew was playing.  Renfrew finished his playing career as the second leading point scorer in the history of Michigan hockey.  He graduated from the School of Education in 1950 and later married the sister of his coach, Vic Heyliger.

College hockey coach
After graduating from Michigan, Renfrew became the hockey coach at Michigan Tech in Houghton, Michigan, from 1951–1956 and at North Dakota for one year. In May 1957, Renfrew's former coach and brother-in-law Vic Heyliger retired as Michigan's hockey coach, and Renfrew accepted the job as Heyliger's replacement.  As the coach of the Wolverines hockey team from 1957–1973, Renfrew had a record of 223-206-11 and one national championship.  The national championship as coach came in 1964 season, when Michigan had a record of 24-4-1. Renfrew's 1964 team, behind the leadership of captain Gordon Wilkie and by Mel Wakabayashi's two goals, beat Denver 6-3 in their home arena to capture the program's seventh NCAA title. With the win, Al Renfrew also became the first person to play on an NCAA championship college hockey team and later coach a national champion. Including his six years as coach at Michigan Tech and North Dakota, his overall record as a coach was 288-286-13.  When Renfrew retired as coach in May 1973, 200 of his friends held a testimonial dinner and presented him and his wife with a two-week trip to Hawaii. After retiring as the hockey coach in 1973, Renfrew worked for many years as the manager of the U-M ticket office.

The "M" Club Banner
Aside from his contributions to the Michigan hockey program, Renfrew and his wife Marguerite are credited in some accounts as the individuals responsible for the football tradition of the "M" Club banner at Michigan Stadium. The tradition started in 1962 with Michigan players racing out of the tunnel and leaping into the air to touch the "Go Blue: M Club Supports You" banner while the Marching Band plays "The Victors."  Renfrew reportedly asked his wife to make two flags to drape over the football lockerrooms to cheer on the team.  She made two flags, with a neighbor, and the Block M was designed by Bob Hoisington, an Engineering Dean, to make sure it was correct. They handmade the flags, which was not an easy feat at the time. Originally, the M Club members hung the banners the lockerroom, and the banners were later moved to the tunnel and then the stadium. After the games, the flags came back home to the Renfrews' home and were hung at their house. Later, the flags were changed to a banner.

Later life, awards and honors
In 1986, Renfrew was inducted into the University of Michigan Athletic Hall of Honor.
He has also received the 1990 Hobey Baker Legends of College Hockey Award, presented each year to an individual who has made great contributions to college hockey, and the 1992 John "Snooks" Kelley Founders Award, given each year to a person in the coaching profession who has contributed to the overall growth and development of the sport of ice hockey in the United States. The "Friends of Al Renfrew" have established an endowed room and board scholarship at Michigan for an ice hockey player.

On November 10, 2014, Renfrew died in Michigan at the age of 89. He had a heart attack three weeks prior and was due to be released from a rehabilitation facility.

Head coaching record

†Michigan played jointly in the Big Ten and WCHA from 1959 to 1981

See also
 University of Michigan Athletic Hall of Honor

References

Further reading
 John U. Bacon, Blue Ice: The Story of Michigan Hockey (Univ. of Mich. Press 2001), Part V: The Renfrew Era, 1957–1973

1924 births
2014 deaths
Michigan Tech Huskies men's ice hockey coaches
Michigan Wolverines men's ice hockey coaches
Michigan Wolverines men's ice hockey players
North Dakota Fighting Hawks men's ice hockey coaches
Ice hockey people from Toronto
Canadian ice hockey left wingers
NCAA men's ice hockey national champions
Canadian expatriates in the United States